Miroslav Mindev (born 27 July 1980) is a former Bulgarian football forward and currently a manager of Zagorets Nova Zagora. Mindev has captained his hometown club.

Career
With Sliven, Mindev became two times the championship's top goalscorer in Bulgarian second division. During the 2006–07 season, he scored 20 goals and over the course of the season 2007–08, he scored 25 goals.

After leading Zagorets Nova Zagora for 7 years, on 29 May 2021 he was announced as the new manager of CSKA 1948 II, but just after one round, on 27 July 2021, he was promoted to CSKA 1948.

Career honours

Head coach
Zagorets Nova Zagora

Southeastern Third League:
 Winners (1): 2016–17

References

1980 births
Living people
Bulgarian footballers
OFC Sliven 2000 players
Neftochimic Burgas players
PFC Beroe Stara Zagora players
PFC Cherno More Varna players
KS Lushnja players
FC Etar 1924 Veliko Tarnovo players
First Professional Football League (Bulgaria) players
Second Professional Football League (Bulgaria) players
Bulgarian expatriate footballers
Expatriate footballers in Albania
Bulgarian expatriates in Albania
Association football forwards
Sportspeople from Sliven